Moha (Sanskrit, Pali: मोह; Tibetan phonetic: timuk) is a concept in both Hinduism and Buddhism, meaning illusion or delusion. In Hinduism, it is one of the six arishadvargas (also known as shadripus). In Buddhist thought, Moha, along with Raga (greed, sensual attachment) and Dvesha (aversion, hate) are unskillful roots that lead to Tanha (craving) which is part of the Twelve Nidanas that propel the wheel of life. It is symbolically present as the pig in the center of Tibetan bhavachakra drawings. Moha refers to desire and attachment to the world or worldly matters. It is sometimes synonymous with "ignorance" (Avijjā).

Moha is identified in the following contexts within the teachings of Buddhism and Hinduism:
 One of the three unwholesome roots within the Theravada Buddhist tradition
 One of the fourteen unwholesome mental factors within the Theravada Abhidharma teachings
 One of the three poisons within the Mahayana Buddhist tradition.

Etymology and meaning
Moha appears in the Vedic literature, and has roots in early Vedic word mogha which means "empty, unreal, vain, useless, foolish". The term, as well as the three defects concept appears in the ancient texts of Jainism and some schools of Hinduism such as Nyaya, in their respective discussion of the theory of rebirths.

The term means "illusion", "delusion, confusion, dullness". The opposite of Moha is Prajna (insight, wisdom). Beliefs different from those considered as insights in Buddhism, are forms of delusions or Moha in Buddhism. Moha is one of the roots of evil, in the Buddhist belief.

Application

In Hinduism "Moh" means attachment to people or things.

This world is dystopia and what we perceive as reality is simulated reality. Everything, including time,is an illusion. This illusion is known as "Maya" to which we have "moh" or an attachment. 

Within the Mahayana tradition, moha is classified as one of the three poisons, which are considered to be the root cause of suffering.

In the Mahayana tradition, moha is considered to be a subcategory of avidyā. Whereas avidyā is defined as a fundamental ignorance, moha is defined as an ignorance of cause and effect or of reality that accompanies only destructive states of mind or behavior.  Moha is sometimes replaced by avidyā in lists of the three poisons. In contemporary explanations of the three poisons, teachers are likely to emphasize the fundamental ignorance of avidyā rather than moha.

See also
 Kleshas (Buddhism)
 Mental factors (Buddhism)
 Three poisons (Buddhism)

References

Sources
 Ajahn Sucitto (2010). Turning the Wheel of Truth: Commentary on the Buddha's First Teaching. Shambhala.
 Mingyur Rinpoche (2007). The Joy of Living: Unlocking the Secret and Science of Happiness. Harmony. Kindle Edition.

External links
 Delusional Thinking - Moha (Hinduism)
 Definition of ignorance, Nina van Gorkom
 The Noble Eightfold Path, The Way to the End of Suffering, by Bhikkhu Bodhi

Unwholesome factors in Buddhism
Sanskrit words and phrases